Vampiro (Ian Richard Hodgkinson, born 1967) is a Canadian professional wrestler.

Vampiro may also refer to:

 Vampiro (comics), a fictional character in the Marvel Comics universe
 Vampiro: Angel, Devil, Hero, a 2008 Canadian documentary film about the wrestler
 Vampiro (cocktail), a mixed drink based on orange juice and tequila

See also
 Vampiro Americano, a ring name of American professional wrestler John Layfield